Cerundolo is a surname. Notable people with the surname include:

 Constanza Cerundolo (born 2000), Argentinian field hockey player
 Francisco Cerúndolo (born 1998), Argentine professional tennis player
 Juan Manuel Cerúndolo (born 2001), Argentine professional tennis player
 Vincenzo Cerundolo (1959–2020), British medical researcher

See also
 Cherundolo, surname

Italian-language surnames